Sir Derrick Melville Dunlop FRSE FRCP FRCPE FRCSE FDS LLD QHP (3 April 1902-9 June 1980) was a senior Scottish physician and pharmacologist at the forefront of British medical administration and policy-making in the late 20th century. He created the Dunlop Committee which investigates the side-effects of new drugs in the UK.

Life

Dunlop was born in Edinburgh on 3 April 1902 the son of Margaret Boog Scott and her husband, Dr George Henry (Harry) Melville Dunlop (185?-1916) of 20 Abercromby Place, an expert in child health and physician at the Edinburgh Sick Children’s Hospital. His father died of pneumonia at Etaples in France during the First World War. A Major in the Royal Army Medical Corps he was one of the oldest physicians to volunteer for active service.

Dunlop attended Edinburgh Academy from 1909-1919. He attended Brasenose College, Oxford and then the University of Edinburgh, graduating with an MB ChB in 1926, followed by an MD gained in 1927.

He worked briefly in London before returning to Edinburgh to work under Sir Robert Philip on pioneering work regarding the treatment of tuberculosis before taking up the Christison Chair in Therapeutics and Clinical Pharmacology aged 34, and also concurrently being Senior Physician at the Edinburgh Royal Infirmary. Dunlop tutored Joyce Baird, who went on to establish a Metabolic Unit and conduct laboratory and clinical research into diabetes and other endocrine disorders.

In 1937 he was elected a Fellow of the Royal Society of Edinburgh. His proposers were Sir Robert William Philip, Arthur Logan Turner, Edwin Bramwell, and Sir Sydney Alfred Smith. In 1946, Dunlop was elected to the Aesculapian Club of Edinburgh. 

He was knighted by Queen Elizabeth II in 1960. In 1961 he was made official Physician to the Queen in Scotland, a post he held until 1965.

He retired from his professorship in 1962. He lived most of his adult life at Bavelaw Castle near Balerno, to the south-west of Edinburgh, just south of Threipmuir Reservoir.
In 1963 the British Government asked him to set up and chair a Committee following the thalidomide tragedy. This was called the Committee on the Safety of Medicines. In 1968 he became the first Chairman of the newly created Medicines Commission.

He died in Edinburgh on 9 June 1980.

Awards and Positions Held
See
 Sims Commonwealth Travelling Professor (1957)
 Honorary degree from University of Birmingham
 Honorary degree from the National University of Ireland
 Honorary degree from the University of Bradford
 Honorary Fellow of the American College of Physicians
 Fellow of Brasenose College, Oxford
 Lumleian and Croonian Lecturer at the Royal College of Physicians
 Chairman of the British Pharmacopeia Commission 1954-58
 Junior President of the Royal Medical Society (1925)
 Bisset Hawkins Medal of the Royal College of Physicians, 1971
 First Chairman of the Royal Medical Society Trust (1979)
 Honorary Fellowship in Dental Surgery
 Director of Winthrop Laboratories

Family

In 1936 he married Marjorie Richardson, eldest daughter of Henry Edward Richardson WS. They had one son and one daughter.
His grand-daughter Tessa Dunlop wrote the book To Romania With Love.

Quotations

In relation to the thalidomide tragedy he said: "if experts are occasionally wrong they are less often wrong than non-experts ....nevertheless, we interfere with the prescribing doctor’s final freedom of decision at our peril in a free democracy".

Publications
 The Textbook of Medical Treatment (1939), co-written with Sir Stanley Davidson and Sir John McNee.
 Clinical Chemistry in Practical Medicine (1954) was co-written with C P Stewart.

References

1902 births
1980 deaths
20th-century Scottish medical doctors
Scottish pharmacologists
Fellows of the Royal Society of Edinburgh
Medical doctors from Edinburgh
Scottish non-fiction writers
People educated at Edinburgh Academy
Alumni of Brasenose College, Oxford
Fellows of the Royal College of Physicians
Fellows of the Royal College of Physicians of Edinburgh
Tuberculosis researchers
Fellows of Brasenose College, Oxford
Physicians of the Royal Infirmary of Edinburgh